The IAR 95 Spey was a Romanian project to produce a supersonic fighter jet for the Romanian Air Force. The project was started in the late 1970s and cancelled in 1981. Shortly after, the project was restarted again. The project was cancelled for good in 1988 due to lack of funds before a prototype could be built, although a full-scale mockup was being constructed.

Design and development
The design was a high-wing monoplane with lateral air intakes, a single fin, and a single engine. Designs with two fins and two engines were also considered, but it was decided to go with the single-engine single-fin design.  Other designations given to this project are IAR-101 and IAR-S and refer to different design layouts.

Romania considered a joint program with Yugoslavia, but the latter declined because it was designing its own supersonic fighter jet, the Novi Avion.

Specifications

The following technical data applies to the design that progressed the furthest:

See also

 FMA SAIA 90

References

Further reading

External links

 Romanian National Institute for Aerospace Research INCAS S.A.
 National Institute for Aerospace Research "Elie Carafoli" - Romanian Supersonic Projects, IAR-95

Cancelled military aircraft projects
95
1980s Romanian fighter aircraft